The 1st Polish Light Cavalry Lancers Regiment of the Imperial Guard ( / ) was a foreign Polish light cavalry lancers regiment which served as part of Napoleon's Imperial Guard during the Napoleonic Wars.  The regiment, as part of Napoleon's Imperial Guard, fought in many battles, distinguishing itself at Wagram, Beresina, Hanau and especially Somosierra. On at least three occasions, light-horsemen of the Regiment saved Napoleon's life.

Origins

The Polish 1st Light Cavalry Regiment of the Imperial Guard, under the command of Wincenty Krasiński, was created by a decree of Napoleon's, and signed on 9 April 1807 in Finckenstein (now Kamieniec Suski in northeast Poland):

Beginning

Polish efforts to form a prestigious detachment of the Imperial Guard began in 1804. Napoleon agreed to this during the Polish Campaign of 1806, when he was escorted by a "Polish Honor Guard" comprising aristocratic youths from the Society of Friends of the Fatherland, leaders of which would in the future be officers of the Regiment. Aspiring Guardsmen distinguished themselves in the Battles of Pułtusk and Gołymin. It is unclear whether Napoleon's reason in agreeing to the Regiment's formation was a desire to control the Polish aristocracy (whose loyalty he could not be sure of) or his appreciation of the Polish contributions to his victories.

The Regiment was an elite body of volunteers in respect of income and origin—peasants were not eligible to enlist. The cadre were drawn almost exclusively from aristocratic and wealthy noble families; most of the rank-and-file soldiers were also noblemen, though burghers—including Jews—were also represented. Some veterans were upset to learn that their officers were callow youths.

In June 1807, the first company of the first squadron was ready to leave Warsaw's Mirów Barracks. Earlier, 125 light cavalry under Captain Tomasz Łubieński had presented themselves to the public and won their acclaim.

Organisation, uniforms and armament
According to intentional Ordre de Bataille Wincenty Krasiński (father of Polish poet Zygmunt Krasiński), was nominated as the commanding officer of the Regiment. COs of four squadrons were appointed: Tomasz Łubieński, Ferdynand Stokowski, Jan Kozietulski and Henryk Kamieński. Each squadron was composed of two companies (demisquadrons) of 125  each. Each company consisted of five troops.

Among troop commanders were: Antoni Potocki, Paweł Jerzmanowski, Łukasz Wybicki (son of Józef Wybicki), Józef Szymanowski, Józef Jankowski, Seweryn Fredro. Positions of Lieutenant-Colonels (grossmajors) and instructors were taken by Frenchmen: Charles Delaitre of the Mamelukes of the Guard, and Pierre "Papa" Dautancourt of Choice Gendarmerie. The regiment consisted of 60 officers and about 1000 men. In 1812 a fifth squadron under Paweł Jerzmanowski was formed. In the beginning of 1813 remnants of 3rd Lithuanian Light Cavalry, detachment of Lithuanian gendarmes, and a company of Lithuanian Tartars were included, so the number of companies rose to 13. During May and June of the same year the number of companies rose to 15 (117 officers and 1,775 men), but in December the original organization was restored – 4 squadrons and 8 companies. 3rd Scout Regiment of the Guard under Jan Kozietulski was formed from the remaining officers and men. Polish chevaux-legers were treated as French soldiers and were on the French payroll. In 1809 (after the battle of Somosierra) the Regiment was incorporated to the Old Guard.

According to the Old Guard seniority they were located after Chasseurs à Cheval, but before Mamelukes. After Napoleon's abdication (6 April 1814)  and scouts were united (minus Paweł Jerzmanowski's squadron, which accompanied the former emperor to Elba). 1 May 1814 the Regiment was transferred from the French Army to the newly created Army of Congress Poland, and on 7 June all squadrons were presented in Saint-Denis before their new Commander, Grand Duke Constantine Pavlovich of Russia and then moved to Poland.

Dark blue kurtka had crimson stand-up collar, wristbands and facings. The snug dark blue pantaloons (breeches) were lined with leather, and ornamented with a single crimson stripe. Collar and facings of the Grand Uniform were ornamented also with silver wavy line, and pantaloons with double crimson stripes (officer's Gala Full Dress was white and crimson). High (22 cm) czapkas had their forehead metals made of brass (officer's of silver) with a rising sun and the letter "N". For the parade czapka was crowned with 47 cm long plume of heron's or ostrich white feathers, and a cockade with a blue center, broad crimson middle band and a narrow white outer edging, with the blue practically hidden under the silver Maltese cross. Officers had blue, while regular soldiers had off-white overcoats, known as manteau-capotes.

 were armed with sabres, initially Prussian of bad quality, and as of March 1809 French sabres. Also, Prussian pistols were replaced gradually with French mousquetonnes. Lances, 2.75 meters long with crimson-and-white pennons, were obtained not earlier than after the battle of Wagram, where they acquired lances of Austrian uhlans, and fought victoriously with these. At that time the name of the Regiment was changed to (fr. 1er Régiment de chevau-légers lanciers Polonais de la Garde Impériale).

The regimental song was "Marsz trębaczy" (‘’Trumpeters March’’):

Operational history

Spain

The regiment was sent, detachment after detachment, to Spain. The first time  fought was on 14 July 1808, during the battle of Medina del Rio Seco (two squadrons under Radzimiński).

On 30 November 1808 their most famous charge up the Somosierra Pass took place. That day the 3rd Squadron under Kozietulski (ad interim) was on duty as a personal escort to the Emperor. After the failure of the French infantry attack, Napoleon ordered Polish  to take the pass defended by 3000 men and four batteries of Spanish cannons. The narrow road to the top (300 meters level difference, 2,500 meters long), bordered from both sides with waist high stone walls, lined with poplar trees, precluded a demi-squadron or even a troop frontal attack. This was why the attack was conducted in a column four horses wide. After the first battery was taken, without slowing the full gallop charge, gained the top of the pass in about eight minutes. All four batteries were taken, and the road to Madrid opened for Napoleon's Army. The charge was led by Kozietulski who, however, lost his horse after taking the first battery. The squadron was then joined by Lt. Andrzej Niegolewski, who had previously been on reconnaissance with his troop. The charge was continued under Dziewanowski, and when he fell from his horse after taking the third battery, by Piotr Krasiński. The charge, which continued to the last battery, was led by Niegolewski, who miraculously survived when the Spanish attacked him (he received nine wounds from bayonets and two carbine shots to the head).

According to the official version, Kozietulski led his men into the charge with the standard French war cry "En avant, vive l'Empereur!".

The charge has been noted as the most effective victory of the Polish cavalry during the time of the Napoleonic Wars, and as the least costly victory for Napoleon. It became a legend and later an inspiration for many writers and painters.

Soon after the battle the regiment was - by Napoleon's decree - included in the Old Guard. It stayed in Spain until February 1809. It took its part in the retaking of Madrid, and in Marshal Soult's campaign against Coalition forces in Portugal. Hundred  under Tomasz Łubieński escorted Napoleon on his way back to Paris.

1809–1811

In the spring of 1809 the War of the Fifth Coalition began. The regiment marched to Austria. On 22 May the light horse took part in the Battle of Essling.

On 6 July 1809, during the Battle of Wagram, the light horse again led a charge that enhanced  their legend. In one daring attack, they smashed Duke Schwarzenberg's uhlans and prevented the whole army from being separated from the banks of the Danube River. During the melée, they grabbed the uhlans’ lances and continued their attack further with these new weapons. Most of Schwarzenberg's uhlans were Poles from Galicia. After the battle, Napoleon supposedly said: "Give them these lances, if they can use them so well." From this point on, they became light-horse lancers.

Over the next two years (1810–11) the Regiment spent time in Chantilly resting, drilling, receiving awards, and from time to time participating in court duties. Some 400 lancers escorted the Emperor and his wife on their trip to Belgium, and Napoleon  during his visit to the maritime provinces. Kozietulski was awarded the officer's star of the Légion d'honneur together with the title of baron, and was nominated for the Polish cross of Virtuti Militari. Wincenty Krasiński was appointed brigadier-general and was created a count. Many other officers and men obtained promotions and awards for gallantry.

Russia
In February 1812 the Regiment was ordered to go to Germany and further East. On March 11 it stopped in Toruń. Then on June 21 (enlarged by the fifth squadron which was formed in Poznań) it crossed the eastern border of the Duchy of Warsaw. On the very next day Napoleon issued in Wyłkowyszki his order, which began the Second Polish War, which was equal with the French invasion of Russia.

In the first stage of the war the Regiment was assigned to the Headquarters of the Emperor, and one squadron was the personal guard of Marshal Davout.  acted from time to time as a military police unit. They also fought near Wilno, Mohylew and Smoleńsk. During the Battle of Borodino they were kept in reserve. Only one squadron went to Moscow with Napoleon (the rest of them followed a few days later). Some fifty -lancers escorted the Emperor from the burning Kremlin, covering him - in the most critical moment - with their overcoats.

The Regiment was one of very few detachments which remained battle-ready until the end. On 25 October it fought at Borovsk and Maloyaroslavets against the Cossacks. The same day a service squadron saved Napoleon, about to be kidnapped by Cossacks near Horodnia. On 17 November  took part in the Battle of Krasnoi, and 28 November in the Battle of Beresina. On 5 December Napoleon left the Army rushing for Paris. The rest of the regiment escorted the imperial treasure, and reached Wilno on 9 December. During the campaign the Regiment suffered tremendous losses. In the end of December there were only 374 men with 270 horses. However, its numbers were still larger than of the other cavalry detachments of the Guard.  gained the great respect of their enemies.

1813–1815

During the campaign of 1813 the Regiment was fighting, but at the same time was being reorganized. In spring four squadrons (under Wincenty Krasiński, Dominik Radziwiłł, Paweł Jerzmanowski, Dezydery Chłapowski) fought battles at Lützen, at Bautzen and at Reichenbach. On 12 July the renovated regiment of seven squadrons was incorporated into the new Grande Armée. This time it was divided into two parts: six companies were attached to the division of the Old Guard under General Walther. Eight younger companies, plus a company of Tartars, were included into the 2nd light cavalry division of General Lefebvre. The first regiment accompanied Napoleon. On September 16 at Peterswalde they smashed a regiment of Prussian hussars under the son of General Blücher. In the battle of Leipzig both regiments took part. After this battle even "old breed"  felt disappointed and frustrated. Some fifty of the younger even deserted.

They fought at Saint Dizier, Brienne, La Rothiere, Champaubert, Montmirail, Vauchamps, Montereau, Troyes, Berry-au-Bac, Craonne, Laon, Reims, La Fere-Champenoise, Arcis-sur-Aube and Vitry. They took part in the battle of Paris. To the end they remained loyal to Napoleon. After the betrayal of Marshal Marmont who was supposed to cover Fontainebleau, Kozietulski led two Polish regiments to the Palace. Here for the last time Napoleon reviewed his Polish detachment of the Guard. After his abdication, the victorious powers excluded  from the French Army. The soldiers of the regiment returned to their once again occupied country, and went into the newly created army of Congress Poland.

Their way back to Poland was not pleasant, especially during the crossing of Prussia, but in Poland they were welcomed with love and respect.

One squadron of volunteers under Major Paweł Jerzmanowski accompanied Napoleon to Elba. During the "March on Paris" the squadron marched as a vanguard of Napoleon's forces. During the "Hundred Days" campaign, 225 men of the Polish detachment fought as part of Red Lancers division under General Colbert, wearing their Polish uniforms (in the decree excluding foreigners from the Guard, Napoleon made the only exception for the Squadron of Elba). Despite a summons by the Grand Duke Constantine, demanding that Jerzmanowski return with his squadron to Poland,  fought at the battle of Ligny and in the battle of Waterloo. After the defeat, the squadron retreated along with Marshal Davout – to the left banks of Loire. On 1 October 1815 all members of the squadron were forced to leave the French Army.

The very last accent of the existence of the Regiment was this letter:

Registre-Matricule

Archival records on the soldiers of the 1st Regiment can be found in genealogical books known as Registre-Matricule.

First book, commenced 14 April 1807 in Warsaw, includes  with record numbers from 1 to 1800. Its last entry was 27 February 1812.

The second book, made in the same manner, was started the same day – 27 February 1812. It covers soldiers registered under numbers 1801 – 3508. The last  was recorded on 25 February 1814. The book contains not only those men who enlisted in the 1st Regiment, but also soldiers of the 3rd Regiment Lithuanian chevaulegers, and a squadron of Lithuanian Tartars included in the 1st Regiment as well.

The third book refers to the 3rd Scout Regiment. It was opened 1 January, and closed 21 March 1814 and contains numbers from 1 to 934. The last, fourth book, refers to the detachment of  reconstituted in 1815 and dissolved a few months later, after the fall of Napoleon. One can find there the names of about 200 Poles from the Squadron of Elba, as well as the latest of the volunteers.

All books contain names of Poles, Dutchmen, Lithuanians, and Frenchmen.

March

During the Bourbon Restoration, after the first abdication of Napoleon, the Chasseurs à Cheval de la Garde Impériale wrote a march in honour of the Polish Lancers with whom they fought for many years. This march is called Les Adieux des Chasseurs à Cheval aux Lanciers polonais ("Farewell of the Chasseurs à Cheval to the Polish Lancers") also known as Les Lanciers polonais ("The Polish Lancers").

Lyrics

Tradition
In the times of the Second Polish Republic the traditions of the 1st Regiment were maintained by 1. Pułk Szwoleżerów Józefa Piłsudskiego, an exclusive regiment of cavalry, the 2nd squadron of which was traditionally the Service Squadron for the president of Poland.

Each year, since the mid-1990s, in the middle of August in Ciechanów and Opinogóra the "Return of the  " festival is organized by the city of Ciechanów, Museum of Romanticism in Opinogóra, Faculty of Arts of the Aleksander Giejsztor College, and many other institutions and organizations. During the spectacle many re-enactment groups from countries such as Poland, Great Britain, Belarus, Lithuania and Latvia present themselves in historical uniforms.

See also

Army of the Duchy of Warsaw
Polish cavalry
Vistula Legion

Notes and references

Further reading
Marian Brandys, Koniec świata szwoleżerów, t. 1, Warszawa 1972
Marian Brandys, Kozietulski i inni, Iskry, Warszawa 1982, 
Dezydery Chłapowski, Memoirs of a Polish Lancer, Chicago 1992, 
David G. Chandler, The Illustrated Napoleon, Henry Holt & Co., New York 1973, 
John R. Elting, Napoleonic Uniforms, t. 2, New York 1993, 
Eligiusz Kozłowski & Mieczysław Wrzosek, Historia oręża polskiego 1795-1939, Warszawa 1984, 
Marian Kukiel, Dzieje oręża polskiego w epoce napoleońskiej 1795-1815, Poznań 1912
Włodzimierz Kwaśniewski, Dzieje szabli w Polsce, Bellona, Warszawa 1999, 
George Nafziger, Mariusz Wesolowski, Poles and Saxons of the Napoleonic Wars, Chicago 1991, 
Ronald Pawly, Napoleon's Polish Lancers of the Imperial Guard, Osprey Publishing 2007, 
Ronald Pawly, Napoleon's Scouts of the Imperial Guard, Osprey Publishing 2006, 
Jan Pachoński, Generał Jan Henryk Dąbrowski 1755-1818, Warszawa 1981, 
Rocznik Woyskowy Królestwa Polskiego na rok 1825, Warszawa 1825

External links
Details of the uniform (Polish)
Uniformology: Gembarzewski's Polish Lancers of the Guard and Lithuanian Tartars
The Imperial Guard and Polish Nationalism by Paul Dawson

Regiments of Napoleon I's Imperial Guard
Military units and formations established in 1807
Military history of Poland
Cavalry regiments of Poland
Military units and formations disestablished in 1814
Cavalry regiments of France